The Bob Hope Humanitarian Award was established in 2002 by the Board of Governors of the Academy of Television Arts & Sciences in recognition of Bob Hope's trailblazing career. The award, one of the highest honors presented by the Board, recognizes the contributions accomplished by Hope, for more than half a century, to the growth and development of broadcasting in radio and television as a family medium, and as a platform for political and social commentary.

Recipients
 2002 – Oprah Winfrey
 2003 – Bill Cosby
 2004 – Danny Thomas  (posthumous)  
 2010 – George Clooney

References

Emmy Awards
Lists of award winners
Awards established in 2002
Humanitarian and service awards
2002 establishments in the United States